In Islam, the belief that spiritual entities—particularly, jinn—can possess  a person, (or a thing or location), is widespread; as is the belief that the jinn and devils can be expelled from the possessed person (or thing/location) through exorcism. This practice is called al-'azm or ruqya and exorcists are called  raqi.

Belief in the supernatural—witchcraft, sorcery, magic, ghosts, and demons—in the Muslim world is not marginalized as eccentric or a product of ignorance, but is pervasive among all social classes. Belief in the supernatural creatures known as Jinn is both an integral part of Islamic belief, and a common explanations in society "for evil, illness, health, wealth, and position in society as well as all mundane and inexplicable phenomena in between". Jinn are thought to be able to enter and possess people, with evil jinn causing various maladies in the humans they possess.

In the contemporary Muslim world (as of 2013), "throughout the Middle East and among Western Muslims", professional exorcism has developed into an industry. Qur'anic healing is advertised on Facebook and Twitter, and "thousands" of videos have been posted on YouTube. Thousands of Islamic exorcisms are also reportedly performed each year (as of 2018) in one country (the United Kingdom) alone.

Spirit possession in Islam 
Possession by spirits is usually defined as an unusual or altered state of consciousness and associated behaviors purportedly caused by the control of a human body by spirits, ghosts, demons, or gods. In the Islamic context, such entities are referred to as marrid (demons), bhut (evil spirits), jinn (spirits or "lesser deities"), shaytaan (satanic beings). The whispering of demons (waswās) is conceptually different from demonic possession in Islamic thought.

Symptoms of possession
Symptoms of a need for exorcism in Islam may range from "yipping and howling", or "fits and screaming" by the possessed victim, to "vomiting, pain in the womb, insomnia, headaches and back-pain, and poor memory",  seizures and speaking "in an incomprehensible language",
to much less obvious behavior, such as anything from "poor health to bad relationships", including homosexuality.

Possessing spirits or beings

Jinn

The primary meaning of jinn is "to hide". Some authors interpret the word to mean, literally, "beings that are concealed from the senses".

In Islamic belief jinn—depending on source/context—may be described as supernatural creatures with specific traits and characteristics or have a broader meaning of spirit or daemon.

Some authors use of the word jinn in the Quran is for all supernatural creatures invisible (to humans). This includes angels, devils, and the interior of human beings. Accordingly, every devil and every angel is also a jinn, but not every jinn is an angel or a devil. Al-Jahiz categorizes the jinn in his work Kitab al-Hayawan as follows: "If he is pure, clean, untouched by any defilement, being entirely good, he is an angel, if he is faithless, dishonest, hostile, wicked, he is devil, if he succeeds in supporting an edifice, lifting a heavy weight and listening at the doors of Heaven he is a marid and if he more than this, he is an ifrit."

More specifically described, jinn are a creature on their own and have both similarities to humans and differences from them. Like people they are not immortal, they eat,
drink, and procreate. They have free will to choose between good and evil, may be Muslims or unbelievers, have received messengers and prophets from God,
and will face judgement day.   Unlike humans, according to the Quran and hadith,
jinn are created from fire or "smokeless fire"; they are invisible to humans, but humans are not invisible to them, can also be visible and have the power to take on different shapes, may be able to travel extremely rapidly and lift great weights. Their food is bones, rotting flesh, 
their animal's food is excrement, and their dwelling places are "ruins or unclean places like bathrooms, dunghills, garbage dumps and graveyards". They are able to possess animate and inanimate objects.

One hadith divides them into three groups, with one type of jinn flying through the air; another type being snakes and dogs; and a third  moving from place to place like human.

Jinn are not supernatural in the sense of being purely spiritual and transcendent to nature; while they are believed to be invisible (or often invisible) they also eat, drink, sleep, breed with the opposite sex, and produce offspring that resemble their parents. Intercourse is not limited to jinn alone, but is also possible between human and jinn.
 
According to Pierre Lory, some jinn tend to have sexual intercourse with humans. There are some hadiths, considered faricated (maudhu) by some Sunni hadith scholars (muhaddith), in support of this view.:  
 Lory states that, in Islamic belief, love is one of the most frequent causes of relationships between humans and jinn Sylvaine Camelin, in her study of exorcism in the Yemeni province of Hadramawt, states:

Other beings 
Although most accounts of possession and exorcism in Islam involve Jinn, Muslim cosmology features more creatures capable of possession, such as marrid (demons), bhut (evil spirits), and shaytaan (satanic beings).

demons.
 ʻafarit—underworld demons— are said to grant the possessed some supernatural powers, but also to drive them insane.
 shayatin—devils—are inherently evil, lacking the free will that jinn and humans have to choose between good and evil.  Iblis, the leader of the shayatin, tempts humans into sin by following the lower nafs (ego or soul) of the human,  whispering temptation (Arabic: waswās وَسْوَاس) to them  Hadiths suggest that the demons/devils whisper from within the human body, within or next to the heart, so it is sometimes thought of as a kind of possession, but of the soul and not the body.
 Spirits neither fitting to ghosts, devils or jinn (Zār ("red wind") and div (fiends)) are other spirits that exorcists check for.

The Quran and hadith indicate demons and devils infect the metaphorical heart, turning the soul and thoughts away from that which is good. They are believed to engage in devilish whisperings to tempt humans that is compared to devil-possession.

Scriptural basis
Most Muslim scholars accept that jinn can possess people. A few argue jinn can not physically possess someone, but only influence people.

According to the conservative fatwa site Islam-web, the "ability of the jinn to possess humans is unanimously agreed upon by Ahlus-Sunnah Wal-Jamaa'ah" [the formal name for Sunni Muslims]. It gives as evidence the verse 
 "Those who consume Riba (interest or usury) cannot stand except as one whom the devil has driven to madness by his touch..." [Quran 2:275] 
adding the commentary of Al-Qurtubi: "This verse serves as evidence of the falseness of the view held by those who deny jinn possession and claim that it is the work of human dispositions and that the devil does not flow within the human body and cannot possess him." The fatwa also cites Ibn Taymiyyah, who wrote, "The entrance of the jinn into the human body is confirmed by the consensus of the Imaams of Ahlus-Sunnah Wal-Jamaa'ah."

Reasons for possession
According to traditional Islamic sources, possession by a jinni can happen for various reasons.  Ibn Taymiyyah asserted a Jinni might sometimes haunt an individual, because the person had  harmed the jinni—urinating or throwing hot water on it, or even killing a related jinni—without intending to or even realizing it. In this case the jinni will try to take revenge on the person.

Another cause for jinn possession, according to Moiz Ansari, is that a jinni falls in love with a human and thereupon possesses the human. Some women have reported that during the time (they believed) they were being possessed by a jinn, the jinn tried to have sexual intercourse from inside their bodies.

Thirdly, it occurs when a jinni, who  is evil, simply wants to harm a human for no specific reason, according to Moiz Ansari. Such a jinn  will possess that person, if it gets the opportunity, while the human is in a very emotional state or unconsciousness.

In his book Rahe Belayet, Abdullah Zahangir states that, evil jinn get chances to influence human mind, when it is in a sinful (or bodily impure) state or in deep emotions such as deep joy, deep sorrow, deep anger, deep frustration, deep obsession and deep sexual urge, but they avoid people who ere extremely pious.

Alizeh Kohari, in a story about UK-based internet Raqi Abu Tharr, writes that "a jinn can take over our mind or body for a number of reasons: it may be evil or infatuated, or simply bored."

There are even, according to some sources, "intended possessions", were there is a covenant with the jinn. Since not all jinn intend to do harm, they are distinguished from cultural concepts of possession by devils/demons.

Possession and religion
Talisman
To protect against jinn possession some people have employed talismans to prevent possession (and other supernatural harm). Pew Research Center states that "Islamic tradition also holds that Muslims should rely on God alone to keep them safe from sorcery and malicious spirits rather than resorting to talismans, which are charms or amulets bearing symbols or precious stones believed to have magical powers, or other means of protection". Scholars differ in opinion on this issue and some maintaining amulets are permitted, provided they are composed of verses from the Quran. Their prohibition in Islam comes from being considered shirk—the sin of practicing idolatry or polytheism— arguing the amulet wearer is asking help from the amulet and not God.

Doubts about possession
Da'wah activist and scholar of religious studies Shabir Ally, who claim not doubt the traditional belief of jinn as invisible beings, questions the scriptural support for jinn possession and exorcism, stating, "as far as I can see there is nothing in the Quran that says that jinn possess people". Q.2:275, the verse quoted to support belief in possession, does state "Those who consume Riba (interest) cannot stand except as one whom the devil has driven to madness by his touch. That is because they say, 'Trade is no different than interest' ...." However there is a big difference between knocking someone to the ground, and possessing a person, speaking through their voice, moving through and using their body. Furthermore, the verse is talking about the effect of charging interest, not a danger of the devil, or jinn, inhabiting a person.

Ruqya (exorcism) practices 
, according to its proponents, summons jinn and demons by invoking the names of God, and  commands them to abandon their mischief, and is believed to repair damage believed to have been caused by jinn possession, witchcraft or the evil eye.
One  kind of Islamic exorcism is al-ruqya al-sharʿiyya. Academic Christian Suhr  describes a successful result of it as providing "healing, not in the sense of immediate 'well-being' or 'relief from pain' but in the sense of moral witnessing". Ruqya is part of a wider body of Islamic medicine called "prophetic medicine".

Interfaith exorcism
At least a few Muslim exorcists have claimed to treat non-Muslims—Imam Ayoub Sayed in Sheffield England: ('Most of our patients come from the Islamic faith. However we have also helped Christians, Sikhs, Hindus and atheists');  "Ali" in Glasgow ('I work with Muslims and non-Muslims alike ... More and more people are getting into alternative healing'). And at least one Christian priest exorcist (as of 2014) has been frequented by Muslims—Father Sama'an Ibrahim at Cairo's St. Sama'an Cathedral in Egypt.

Appropriate qualities for exorcists 
Al-Jzari (1987) and Al-Daramdash (1991) list several characteristics for a Quranic-Healer of possession. These include belief in God, following the prophet Muhammad's practice as personified by Islamic saints, belief that the Quran can influence evil spirits, must be a righteous person and doing nothing that is forbidden, have knowledge of the world of evil spirits, know which Surahs to use for specific types of spirits, have a sense of good-will to help people attacked by evil spirits, resistance to any   distraction from sexual dynamics during the process, and mindfulness of God during throughout the process in order to avoid infiltration by evil spirits.

Examples of exorcist procedure

Alizeh Kohari writes that "in a typical exorcism, you lie down, while the raqi places their palm on your head and recites verses."

Najat Khalifa and Tim Hardie write that there are three ways for a therapist to expel jinn:
"remembrance of God and recitation of the Quran";
"blowing into the possessed person's mouth, cursing and commanding the jinn to leave";
"seeking refuge with Allah by calling upon Allah, remembering him and addressing his creatures".

According to a study by Alean Al-Krenawi and John Graham,
the process of Quranic healing in order to exorcise spirits can be divided into three stages. 
 Removing any (haram) distractions, such as music instruments and golden jewelry. All pictures in the room that (it is believed) would allow angels to enter are removed. The healer then tells the client and the family that everything happens by God's will and that he is merely a mediator, also mentioning that other forms of healing, such as by sorcery, are not acceptable to Islam. 
 The healer determines if the client is possessed or not and tries to enter a dialogue with the spirit. The healer might ask the spirit about type (Zar ("red wind"), ghosts (Arwah), jinn (genii), samum (devils), div), religion, sex or reason for possession.  He also asks the client, not the spirit, about dreams and feelings involved in the dream. After that, the healer cleans himself, the room, and asks the people in the room to do the same. 
 The actual exorcism begins by reciting Quranic verses such as Al-Fatiha, Al Baqara, Al-Baqara 255, the last two verses of Al-Baqara, Al-Jinn and three Qul (Al-Ikhlas, An-Nas and Al-Falaq), depending on the type of spirit. Other treatments include using honey and water, as a purification ritual to clean the soul and body from sins.

At an exorcism at Masjid Mohammed mosque in Sheffield, South Yorkshire by Imam Ayoub Sayed, a young woman sought help to rid herself of what she believed were spirits caused by black magic.  The woman, dressed  in a burqa with a face covering, blamed possession by spirits for symptoms of vomiting, pain in the womb, insomnia, headaches and back-pain, and poor memory, and for inability to find a husband. During the exorcism the woman rocked backwards and forwards shouting and screaming while the exorcist, Imam Ayoub Sayed used a microphone to amplify recitation of Quran and shouts in English of 'can you find God, can you find him?' to banish the jinni. The woman "screams out uncontrollably while thrashing around on a couch before picking up a nearby table", at which point the exorcist spits in her face. (The article did not indicate whether the exorcism was successful.)

Fatalities
Exorcisms that did not end successfully were those of Latifa Hachmi (found dead on 5 August 2004), and Naila Mumtaz (found dead 8 July 2009).

Hachmi's body was "covered with bruises and her lungs filled with water". She had undergone "month-long sessions" of exorcism  in Brussels Belgium involving beatings, swallowing "dozens of liters of 'holy' water, "according to Belgian media reports". She was "fed two spoons of yogurt every day and always had earphones playing verses from the Quran." She  was thought to be possessed at least in part because she could not become pregnant. (The exorcist, Abdelkrim Aznagui, and five others were charged in the killing.)

In Naila Mumtaz's case, three of her inlaws and her husband were found guilty of murder. The judge believed the most likely reason for the killing of the 21-year-old Pakistani brought to England in an arranged marriage was that "the defendants believed that Naila had been possessed by a djinn, which had been sent from Pakistan by Naila's parents, and that they ... smothered her in order to get rid of the djinn." The exorcist or "healer" is thought to have been "in the room" when Mumtaz died, but has "never been traced", something that "has happened in other cases". 
Shabir Ally states that deaths from beatings administered to people in the belief that this would drive the jinn out of the possessee, have become so frequent as to no longer be big news.

Treatment of mentally ill at shrines
In one Muslim country, Afghanistan, a common exorcism practice as of 2013 that has been criticized as inhumane, was to secure
 the mentally ill to [religious] shrines for forty days to ritually exorcise the jinn "possessing" them. Patients are fed a strict diet of bread and black pepper, do not have a change of clothing, and sleep on the ground. Those who do not survive the treatments are buried in earthen mounds around the shrine.

Doubts about exorcism

Religious questions
Some Muslims find "no scriptural support" for exorcism. According to one source (the modernist site alhakam), there is "no trace" of support for exorcism  in the  Quran, and among the traditions of Muhammad (hadith) there is only one story of exorcism, and it is classified as da'eef, (i.e. "weak", it was narrated by an untrusted narrator).
Domestic abuse questions 
The BBC quotes a woman (Yasmin Ishaq) who "became a healer herself because she saw peoples' beliefs being exploited", and complaints of domestic abuse being dismissed as the rantings of a possessing spirit,
"If somebody was saying I was being abused, or I'm living in horrific conditions, they would automatically silence them by saying 'she's possessed'. I'm talking from personal experiences - family members, neighbours, community members - where women were beaten on the premise that they were possessed when really it was just violence against women."

Confusion with mental illness
Secularists note that mental illness "has been attributed to demonic possession" throughout history, the oldest known attribution coming from the Sumerians, "who believed that all diseases of the body and mind were caused by 'sickness demons' called gidim or gid-dim". 
According to some Islamic sources, cases of 'pseudopossession', where the origin of someone's seizure or speaking in tongues is  "physical or psychological", greatly outnumber cases of true spiritual possession, and it is unfortunate that faith healers have taken money to treat such cases. (A concern shared by Shabir Ally.)

A study of why patients from "ethnic minority backgrounds" in Britain, "particularly Pakistanis", "were often reaching mental health services in a more severely ill state than the rest of the population", found ethnic families first sought help "through the mosque," when confronted with a member who was hearing voices, suffering from delusions or some other serious mental illness.
A paper published in 2015 by Elspeth Guthrie, Seri Abraham, Shahzada Nawaz, noted a review "of 47 case reports of patients presenting with symptoms they attributed to jinn found that a biomedical diagnosis was provided in 66% of cases, of which schizophrenia was the most common (45.2%)";
and asks whether belief in jinn  sometimes leads  to a delay in "appropriate treatment", 
a delay meaning not only unnecessary suffering but opportunity for the mental illness to progress and worsen.  Another study, of university educated school teachers and undergraduates in Saudi Arabia, found "jinn possession is still believed to be a cause of epilepsy in Saudi society, even among fairly well-educated people". 40% of the teachers and half the students surveyed believed possession to be the cause of epilepsy. (A number of medical journals have urged practitioners to seek greater understanding of possession states "through a combination of biological, anthropological, sociological, psychopathological and experimental perspectives"; "increase awareness among physicians about the possible association of delirious mania with jinn possession by conducting training, continuing medical education, workshops, and the like"; develop "collaborative working
relationships [with] Islamic religious professionals ...", etc.)

In reply, one Raqi (Abou Mohammed) reverses the charge, alleging that "some illnesses are unnecessarily dealt with by doctors when they are actually spiritual problems", and that "some people have operations they do not need because the Jinn has tricked doctors".

See also 
 Spirit possession#Islam
 Islam and magic
 Outline of Islam
 Glossary of Islam
 Index of Islam-related articles
 Devil
 Demonic possession
 Al-Mu'awwidhatayn

References

Notes

Citations

Bibliography
 
 
 
 
 
 
 
 
 
 

 
Medicine in the medieval Islamic world
Occultism (Islam)
Jinn